Flank steak is a cut of beef steak taken from the abdominal muscles of the cow, located just behind the plate and in front of the rear quarter. It is a long, flat cut with a significant grain, and is known for its bold flavor and chewiness.

Terminology
French butchers call the cut bavette, which means "bib". In Brazil, it is called fraldinha ("little diaper"). The cut is common in Colombia, where they call it sobrebarriga ("over the belly"); sobrebarriga a la brasa is a Colombian recipe for braised flank steak. Argentina, Uruguay, Spain, and Rio Grande do Sul call flank steak vacío ("empty").

Use
 

Flank steak is used in a variety of dishes including London broil and as an alternative to the traditional skirt steak in fajitas. It can be grilled, pan-fried, broiled, or braised for increased tenderness. Grain (meat fibre) is very apparent in flank steaks, as it comes from a well-exercised part of the cow, and many chefs cut across the grain to make the meat more tender. It is frequently used in Asian cuisine, often sold in Chinese markets as "stir-fry beef", and is served in French cuisine as an at most medium-rare steak. Flank also serves as a common cut for steak jerky.

See also
 
 List of steak dishes
 Sirloin steak
 Ribeye steak
 Hanger steak
 Skirt steak
 Flap steak

References

External links 
 

Cuts of beef
Mexican cuisine

ca:Falda